= Dikwidae =

Scientific classification
- Kingdom: Animalia
- Phylum: Arthropoda
- Clade: Pancrustacea
- Class: Malacostraca
- Order: Amphipoda
- Suborder: Amphilochidea
- Infraorder: Amphilochida
- Parvorder: Amphilochidira
- Superfamily: Iphimedioidea
- Family: Dikwidae; Coleman & Barnard, 1991
- Genus: Dikwa; Griffiths, 1974

Genus of crustaceans

Dikwa is a genus of amphipods in the family Dikwidae, containing the following species:

- Dikwa acrania Griffiths, 1974
- Dikwa andresi Lörz & Coleman, 2003
